Sean Carton is the Chief Strategist for idfive, LLC, a full-service agency located in Baltimore, Maryland. 

Previously, he headed the Center for Digital Communication, Culture, and Commerce at the University of Baltimore. Sean was the founder of one of Baltimore's first digital agencies, web development company Carton Donofrio Interactive, and the former Dean of the School of Design and Media at Philadelphia University. 

He is the author of numerous books about the Internet and video games. 

Carton coined the term egosurfing in the late nineties.

References 

Year of birth missing (living people)
Living people
University of Maryland, Baltimore County alumni